Taylor Perry (born 23 July 2000) is a Canadian rugby union player.

Perry was named in Canada's squad for the delayed 2021 Rugby World Cup in New Zealand. She was ruled out of the World Cup after she sustained a serious knee injury during training in preparation for their opening match against Japan.

References

External links 

 Taylor Perry at Rugby Canada

Living people
2000 births
Female rugby union players
Canadian female rugby union players
Canada women's international rugby union players